Louis Bertrand Goodall (September 23, 1851 in Winchester, New Hampshire – June 26, 1935 in Sanford, Maine) was a United States representative from Maine. He moved to Troy, New Hampshire with his parents in 1852.  He attended the common schools of Troy, then attended a private school in Thompson, Connecticut, the Vermont Episcopal Institute, a private school in England, and the Kimball Union Academy.

He entered his father's mills at Sanford, Maine in 1874 and afterward engaged extensively in the wool-manufacturing industry and in the railroad business.  He established the Goodall Worsted Co., which originated Palm Beach cloth.  He became president of the Sanford National Bank from its organization in 1896, and became chairman of the Maine commission to the Louisiana Purchase Exposition, St. Louis, Mo., in 1904. He was elected as a Republican to the Sixty-fifth and Sixty-sixth Congresses (March 4, 1917 – March 3, 1921).  He was elected chairman of the Committee on Elections No. 2 (Sixty-sixth Congress).

He was not a candidate for renomination in 1920. He resumed manufacturing interests and banking in Sanford, Maine, until his death there. His interment was in Oakdale Cemetery.

References

External links 
 

1851 births
1935 deaths
People from Sanford, Maine
People from Winchester, New Hampshire
Republican Party members of the United States House of Representatives from Maine